Shani Olisa Hilton (born 1986) is an American journalist and media executive, currently working as the Deputy Managing Editor at the Los Angeles Times. Prior to the Times, Hilton was the executive editor at BuzzFeed News.

Early life
Growing up with a journalist father, Hilton began working on the student newspaper in middle school and continued at Bear Creek High School in Stockton, California. She attended Howard University in D.C. and studied journalism.

Career
Only a few years out of college, Hilton joined Buzzfeed in 2013 as senior editor, after working at Washington City Paper and NBC Washington. She was promoted to executive editor in September 2014. Politico has called her "the youthful conscience of Buzzfeed News" and Recode calls her "Buzzfeed's Newsmaker in Chief." The New York Observer named her to a list of "10 Players in Media You Must Hire."

Hilton is regularly cited as an expert on topics like journalistic ethics, millennial audiences for newsmedia, and diversity in the newsroom. She wrote a widely cited essay on the subject in 2014, entitled "Building A Diverse Newsroom Is Work."

References

Living people
1986 births
African-American women journalists
African-American journalists
21st-century American non-fiction writers
BuzzFeed people
Howard University alumni
Writers from California
American women non-fiction writers
21st-century American women writers
21st-century African-American women writers
21st-century African-American writers
20th-century African-American people
20th-century African-American women